Fathabad (also Romanized as Fatḩābād; also known as Fathēbād) is a village in Deris Rural District, in the Central District of Kazerun County, Fars Province, Iran. At the 2006 census, its population was 199, in 46 families.

References 

Populated places in Kazerun County